The 1926 Wyoming Cowboys football team was an American football team that represented the University of Wyoming as a member of the Rocky Mountain Conference (RMC) during the 1926 college football season. In their third and final season under head coach William Henry Dietz, the Cowboys compiled a 2–4–2 record (1–2–2 against conference opponents), finished eighth in the RMC, and outscored opponents by a total of 152 to 91.

Schedule

References

Wyoming
Wyoming Cowboys football seasons
Wyoming Cowboys football